Schweikart is a surname. Notable people with the surname include:

 Ferdinand Karl Schweikart (1780–1857), German jurist and amateur mathematician
 Hans Schweikart (1895–1975), German film director, actor, and screenwriter
 Larry Schweikart (born 1951), American historian
 Rich Schweikart, fictional character in the American TV series Better Call Saul

See also 
 Schweickart, a surname
 Schweikert, a surname